Raoul Le Mat (September 3, 1875 – February 15, 1947) was an American film director and ice hockey coach, most famous for introducing ice hockey in Sweden during the early 1920s.

Together with Ernest Viberg and Thomas Cahill, Le Mat introduced ice hockey in Sweden, and coached the Swedish national team in their first international tournament at the 1920 Summer Olympics in Antwerp, Belgium. He was also the founding member of the Swedish Ice Hockey Association. When the first Swedish Championship in ice hockey was played in 1922, Le Mat refereed the final game.

The Swedish Hockey League's Le Mat Trophy is named after Le Mat and was donated by him, with the monetary support of Metro-Goldwyn-Mayer, in 1926.

References

1875 births
1947 deaths
American film directors
American ice hockey coaches
Sweden men's national ice hockey team coaches
Swedish ice hockey administrators
Swedish ice hockey coaches
Swedish ice hockey officials
French emigrants to Sweden